Sigrún Edda Björnsdóttir (born 30 August 1958) is an Icelandic actress and author.

Early life 
Sigrún was born in Reykjavík, Iceland to parents Guðrún Ásmundsdóttir, actress and  Björn Björnsson, flight mechanic. Her half-brother through her mother is the performance artist Ragnar Kjartansson.

Career 
Sigrún graduated from the Icelandic Theater School in 1981. She has played in numerous productions for the National Theater of Iceland as well as other theaters. She has played roles including Pippi Longstocking to Ophelia in Hamlet.

Personal life 
Sigrún has two children and is married to set designer Axel Hallkell Jóhannesson.

In 2001, Sigrún released her first book. The book is about a young troll girl Bóla and her friend Hnútur on their adventures from their home in Þingvellir to a 17 June (Iceland's Independence Day) celebration in Reykjavík. Bóla is a character Sigrún created and played for children's television in 1990.

Filmography 
 Morðsaga (1977) as Frú B
 Óðal feðranna (1980) as Stelpa á útimóti
 Atómstöðin (1984) as Guðný Árland
 Fastir liðir eins og venjulega (TV-series) (1985) as Erla
 SSL-25 (Short) (1990) 
 Einkalíf (1995) as Sísí, Alexanders mother
 Áramótaskaup 2001 (2001) various roles
 Réttur (TV-series) (2010) as Eva
 Svartur á leik (2012) as Sævar K's Mother
 Metalhead (2013) as Anna
 Afinn (2014) as Erla
 Ófærð (TV-series) (2015-2016) as Kolbrún

References

External links 
 

Living people
1958 births
Sigrun Edda Bjornsdottir
Sigrun Edda Bjornsdottir
Sigrun Edda Bjornsdottir
Sigrun Edda Bjornsdottir
Sigrun Edda Bjornsdottir
Sigrun Edda Bjornsdottir
Sigrun Edda Bjornsdottir